David Starsky is a main character in the 1970s TV series Starsky & Hutch and its spin-offs including:
Starsky & Hutch (film), 2004
Starsky & Hutch (video game)

Starsky may also refer to:

 Morris Starsky (1933–1989), American philosopher and activist
Starsky Wilson, a Black activist
 Starsky Robotics, autonomous trucking company

See also
Starski, a similar surname starsky 
Zdarsky, a similar surname